Knucklehead is a 2015 American drama film directed by Ben Bowman. It premiered at the 2015 BAMCinématek New Voices in Black Cinema festival.

Plot
Convinced that prescription drugs can cure his mental disorder, a neighborhood eccentric (Gbenga Akinnagbe) ventures out of Brooklyn’s housing projects to escape his controlling mother (Alfre Woodard), and to find the one doctor who he believes can treat him.

Cast
Gbenga Akinnagbe as Langston
Alfre Woodard as Sheila
Amari Cheatom as Julian
Carla Duren
Nikiya Mathis
Justin Myrick
Lauren Hodges
DeWanda Wise as Charlotte

Release
The film premiered as the opening night film at the BAMCinématek New Voices in Black Cinema festival at the Brooklyn Academy of Music on March 26, 2015. It was scheduled for release in the U.S. and Canada in late 2016.

Critical reception
Colin Covert gave the film a positive review in Newsweek, writing: “Deftly combining melancholy, tragedy and sly humor, the story is engineered so its gripping drama dovetails neatly with the lead's starry-eyed optimism and the likability of sundry supporting characters. As if juggling chainsaws, Bowman delivers a film that is both troubling and comically upbeat“

Julie Walker, writing for The Root, said "Knucklehead packs an emotional punch," and declared that Gbenga Akinnagbe "owns the movie" in his first leading role as the mentally challenged Langston.

John Defore at The Hollywood Reporter praised the cast, also citing Akinnagbe for his “sympathetic performance" in a film "that will attract attention for a brutal turn by Alfre Woodard as his controlling mother.” Justin S. Myrick is called out for his portrayal of Arthur, Langston's young friend with, "a smartass spark that animates scenes and balances the bleak situation at home."

Accolades

References

External links
 
 

2015 films
American drama films
2015 drama films
2010s English-language films
2010s American films